Monachty is a small village in the  community of Dyffryn Arth, Ceredigion, Wales, which is 67.8 miles (109.1 km) from Cardiff and 180.4 miles (290.4 km) from London. Monachty is represented in the Senedd by Elin Jones (Plaid Cymru) and the Member of Parliament is Ben Lake (Plaid Cymru).

References

See also
List of localities in Wales by population

Villages in Ceredigion